is the 9th major-label single by the Japanese girl idol group Shiritsu Ebisu Chugaku. It was released in Japan on October 21, 2015, on the label SME Records.

Release details 
The CD single was released in three versions: a "regular edition" and two limited editions: Limited Edition A and Limited Edition B. The differences between the editions are the cover art and the B-sides.

B-sides 
One of the B-sides, the song "Pompara Pekoluna Papiyotta", is performed by the rock group , which was created from the members of Shiritsu Ebisu Chugaku as part of celebration of the 50th anniversary of the Coconut Sable cookies produced by Nissin Cisco Co., Ltd.

Reception 
According to Oricon, in its first week of release the physical CD single sold 69,000 copies. It debuted at number 3 in the Oricon weekly singles chart. Thus in its first week the CD single already topped the overal sales of the group's 7th single "Haitateki!" and became the most selling single in the band's history.

According to Oricon, it was also the 81st best selling CD single of the whole year 2015 in Japan.

Track listing

Regular Edition

Limited Edition A

Limited Edition B

Charts

Year-end charts

References

External links 
 Discography on the Shiritsu Ebisu Chugaku official site

2015 singles
Japanese-language songs
Shiritsu Ebisu Chugaku songs
SME Records singles
2015 songs